Maureen Connell (born 2 August 1931) is a British actress.

Personal life
On 20 July 1956, Connell married British film director, writer and producer John Guillermin.  They resided in the Los Angeles area beginning 1968. They had two children, Michelle and Michael-John, the latter of whom died in 1984 in a car accident in Truckee, California.

Selected filmography
 Golden Ivory (1954)
 Port Afrique (1956)
 The Rising of the Moon (1957)
 Lucky Jim (1957)
 Town on Trial (1957)
 Kill Her Gently (1957)
 The Abominable Snowman (1957)
 Stormy Crossing (1958)
 The Man Upstairs (1958)
 Next to No Time (1958)
 The Crowning Touch (1959)
 Never Let Go (1960)
 Danger by My Side (1962)
 Skyjacked (1972)

Television
 ITV Television Playhouse (1955)
 The Adventures of the Scarlet Pimpernel (1956) (Episode 4: 'A Tale of Two Pigtails')
 Espionage (TV series) ('Snow on Mount Kama', episode) (1964) (as Eva Marston)
 Danger Man TV series ('Yesterday's Enemies', Series 2 Episode 1) Jo Dutton (1964)

References

External links
 

1931 births
Living people
People from Nairobi
British film actresses
British television actresses
British emigrants to the United States
20th-century British actresses